Cyril William Gill (21 April 1902 – 1 September 1989) was a British sprinter who competed at the 1928 Summer Olympics in Amsterdam, the Netherlands. He won a bronze medal in the 4 × 100 m relay, together with Edward Smouha, Walter Rangeley and Jack London, and failed to reach the finals of the 100 m and 200 m events.

References

1902 births
1989 deaths
British male sprinters
Olympic bronze medallists for Great Britain
Athletes (track and field) at the 1928 Summer Olympics
Olympic athletes of Great Britain
English male sprinters
People from the Royal Borough of Kensington and Chelsea
Athletes from London
Medalists at the 1928 Summer Olympics
Olympic bronze medalists in athletics (track and field)
20th-century British people